Scopula dissonans is a moth of the family Geometridae. It was described by William Warren in 1897. It is found in the Democratic Republic of the Congo, Ethiopia, Kenya, Nigeria, South Africa, Tanzania and Uganda.

References

Moths described in 1897
Moths of Africa
dissonans
Taxa named by William Warren (entomologist)